Aliabad-e Chahi (also Romanized as 'Alīābād-e Chāhī) is a village in Dehpir Rural District, in the Central District of Khorramabad County, Lorestan Province, Iran. At the 2006 census, its population was 98, in 20 families.

References 

Towns and villages in Khorramabad County